Erethistoides longispinis is a species of sisorid catfish from the Irrawaddy River basin in central Myanmar.

References

Catfish of Asia
Fish of Myanmar
Taxa named by Heok Hee Ng
Taxa named by Carl J. Ferraris Jr.
Taxa named by David A. Neely
Fish described in 2012
Sisoridae